Wu Wenguang 吴文光 (born 1956 in Yunnan) is a Chinese independent documentary filmmaker.  He is known internationally as one of the founding figures of Chinese independent documentary.  His first film, Bumming in Beijing: The Last Dreamers, featured a large amount of handheld camerawork and unscripted interviews.  This was a stark contrast to Chinese documentaries produced previously, which were generally carefully planned and controlled.

References

External links

"Portrait: Wu Wenguang (吴文光)" Goethe-Institut China Online Magazine, April 2014 (English)

1956 births
Living people
Chinese documentary filmmakers
Film directors from Yunnan
Chinese film directors